The Croatian Christian Democratic Union of Bosnia and Herzegovina (HKDU BiH) is a minor Croatian political party in Bosnia and Herzegovina.

See also
Croatian Christian Democratic Union

External links
Official web site

Catholic political parties
Conservative parties in Bosnia and Herzegovina
Croatian nationalist parties
Croat political parties in Bosnia and Herzegovina